"We've Got Tonight" is a song by Bob Seger.

We've Got Tonight may also refer to:
 We've Got Tonight (Kenny Rogers album), 1983
 We've Got Tonight (Elkie Brooks album)